Harrisburg is a city in Linn County, Oregon, United States. The population was 3,567 at the 2010 census.

Geography

Demographics

2010 census
As of the census of 2010, there were 3,567 people, 1,238 households, and 966 families living in the city. The racial makeup of the city was 91.3% White, 0.5% African American, 1.0% Native American, 0.3% Asian, 0.1% Pacific Islander, 3.2% from other races, and 3.4% from two or more races. Hispanic or Latino of any race were 8.0% of the population.

There were 1,238 households, of which 44.3% had children under the age of 18 living with them, 60.3% were married couples living together, 12.8% had a female householder with no husband present, 4.8% had a male householder with no wife present, and 22.0% were non-families. 17.2% of all households were made up of individuals, and 5.8% had someone living alone who was 65 years of age or older. The average household size was 2.88 and the average family size was 3.21.

The median age in the city was 33.7 years. 30.4% of residents were under the age of 18; 7.3% were between the ages of 18 and 24; 29.5% were from 25 to 44; 24.2% were from 45 to 64; and 8.6% were 65 years of age or older. The gender makeup of the city was 49.4% male and 50.6% female.

2000 census
As of the census of 2000, there were 2,795 people, 989 households, and 751 families living in the city. The population density was 1,748.8 people per square mile (674.5/km2). There were 1,038 housing units at an average density of 649.5 per square mile (250.5/km2). The racial makeup of the city was 92.99% White, 0.11% African American, 1.22% Native American, 0.57% Asian, 2.86% from other races, and 2.25% from two or more races. Hispanic or Latino of any race were 5.69% of the population.

There were 989 households, out of which 43.2% had children under the age of 18 living with them, 60.0% were married couples living together, 11.0% had a female householder with no husband present, and 24.0% were non-families. 17.6% of all households were made up of individuals, and 6.1% had someone living alone who was 65 years of age or older. The average household size was 2.83 and the average family size was 3.19.

In the city, the population was spread out, with 31.4% under the age of 18, 9.2% from 18 to 24, 32.5% from 25 to 44, 18.1% from 45 to 64, and 8.8% who were 65 years of age or older. The median age was 31 years. For every 100 females, there were 104.0 males. For every 100 females age 18 and over, there were 99.3 males.

The median income for a household in the city was $40,106, and the median income for a family was $41,953. Males had a median income of $34,509 versus $25,298 for females. The per capita income for the city was $15,822. About 6.4% of families and 9.7% of the population were below the poverty line, including 11.8% of those under age 18 and 6.0% of those age 65 or over.

See also
Harrisburg circa 1920

References

External links

Entry for Harrisburg in the Oregon Blue Book
Historic images of Harrisburg from Flickr

Cities in Oregon
Cities in Linn County, Oregon
1866 establishments in Oregon
Populated places established in 1866
Populated places on the Willamette River